The Party of the Hutu Emancipation Movement (Parmehutu), also known as the Republican Democratic Movement – Parmehutu (Mouvement démocratique républicain – Parmehutu, MDR-Parmehutu), was a political party in Rwanda. The movement emphasised the right of the majority ethnicity to rule and asserted the supremacy of Hutus over Tutsis. It was the most important party of the "Hutu Revolution" of 1959–61 that led to Rwanda becoming an independent republic and Hutus superseding Tutsis as the ruling group.

History
The party was founded by Grégoire Kayibanda in June 1957 as the Hutu Social Movement, a party of Hutu nationalists who fought for the emancipation of the "oppressed" Hutu majority. It was renamed on 25 September 1959, and dominated the local elections in 1960, winning 2,390 of 3,125 elected communal council seats and 160 of 229 burgomasters.

In 1961, parliamentary elections were held alongside a referendum on the Tutsi monarchy of Mwami Kigeri V. MDR-Parmehutu won 35 of the 44 seats in the Legislative Assembly, whilst the referendum saw the end of the monarchy. Kayibanda appointed a government of Hutus, and became president after independence in July 1962. By 1965, it was the only legal party in the country, and the 1965 elections saw Kayibanda run unopposed for the presidency and the party win all 47 National Assembly seats.

Under the Parmehutu rule, Tutsis were severely discriminated against, persecuted, and repeatedly massacred, leading to hundreds of thousands of Tutsi fleeing the country. The 1963 Tutsi massacres were described by Bertrand Russell as "the worst since the Holocaust"; in 1967 another 20,000 Tutsi were killed.

In the July 1973 coup, Kayibanda was ousted by his cousin Major-General Juvénal Habyarimana who, like other leaders from Rwanda's north (abakonde) felt marginalised by the Southern-dominated Parmehutu regime. The Parmehutu party was suspended and was officially banned two years later when Rwanda became a one-party state under Habyarimana's new National Revolutionary Movement for Development (MRND), which was dominated by Hutu from the northern and northwestern parts of the country.

Electoral history

Presidential Elections

Chamber of Deputies elections

See also 
National Revolutionary Movement for Development (MRND)

References

Further reading
 

Defunct political parties in Rwanda
Defunct political parties in Burundi
1957 establishments in Ruanda-Urundi
Political parties established in 1957
1973 disestablishments in Rwanda
Political parties disestablished in 1973
Parties of one-party systems
Ruanda-Urundi